Parakulangara Thazathel Mohana Krishnan (Malayalam: പി.ടി.മോഹന കൃഷ്ണൻ; 27 March 1934 – 10 January 2020) was the member of the All India Congress Committee (AICC), a MLA of Ponnani constituency, and a social and political leader in Kerala. He was a member of the AICC since 1965.

Personal life
Mohana Krishnan was born on 27 March 1934 as the son of Shri K. P. Govinda Menon and Smt. Annapoorneswari Amma. He lived in Ponnani with his wife Nalini Mohana Krishnan. They had 5 children: 3 daughters, Asha Ramachandran, Hema Mohan & Sindhu Unni; and 2 sons, P. T. Sudheer Govind and P. T. Ajay Mohan, who is an active politician.

Positions held
 Chairman and vice president of Kerala State Bamboo Corporation.
 MLA, Ponnani (Assembly constituency).
 K.P.C.C. Executive committee, Member, Vice President and Acting President of Malappuram D.C.C.
 Chairman - United Democratic Front, Malappuram District
 Chairman - Guruvayoor Devaswom Managing Committee.

References

External links
 P.T. Mohana Krishnan's official page on Facebook.
 P.T. Mohana Krishnan on KPCC Website.

1935 births
Indian National Congress politicians from Kerala
2020 deaths
People from Malappuram district
Members of the Kerala Legislative Assembly